Fusu (died 210BC) was the eldest son and heir apparent of Qin Shi Huang, the First Emperor of the Qin dynasty.

Life
After being deceived by two alchemists while seeking prolonged life, the First Emperor supposedly ordered more than 460 scholars in the capital to be buried alive, though an account given by Wei Hong in the 2nd century added another 700 to the figure. Fusu counselled that, with the country newly unified, and enemies still not pacified, such a harsh measure imposed on those who respect Confucius would cause instability. However, he was unable to change his father's mind, and instead was sent to guard the frontier, where Meng Tian was stationed, in a de facto exile.

Moreover, after the death of the First Emperor, Fusu's youngest brother, Huhai, together with two high officials Zhao Gao and Li Si, forged his father's decree to rename Huhai as the successor and order Fusu to commit suicide. Some aides of Fusu, including Meng Tian, doubted the veracity of the decree, but Fusu either did not believe someone would dare to forge the decree or, with good reason, feared being killed anyway, and he committed suicide.

Legacy
According to Records of the Grand Historian, Fusu had a son, Ziying, who was enthroned after Zhao Gao forced Huhai to commit suicide in 207 BCE. By that time, Li Si had already been eliminated by Zhao Gao. Ziying soon killed Zhao Gao.

There is no firm consensus on what Ziying's relationship to the Qin royal family really is. Some scholars (among them Professor Wang Liqun) pointed out that Fusu's son might be too young to plot the demise of Zhao Gao, as two sons of Ziying, also involved in the plot, should have been old enough. Qin Shi Huang only lived to be 49; Fusu might have only lived into his 30s.

He sometimes appears as a door god in Chinese and Taoist temples, usually paired with Meng Tian.

References

Citations

Bibliography
 Sima, Qian. Records of the Grand Historian (Shiji).

Executed Qin dynasty people
Suicides in the Qin dynasty
210 BC deaths
Forced suicides of Chinese people
Politicians from Xianyang
Year of birth unknown
3rd-century BC executions
Executed people from Shaanxi
People executed by the Qin dynasty
Chinese gods
Deified Chinese people
Qin Shi Huang
Heirs apparent who never acceded
Identity theft victims